Santa Barbara is a 2014 South Korean romance film starring Lee Sang-yoon and Yoon Jin-seo. It was written and directed by David Cho (also known as Cho Sung-kyu).

Plot
Jung-woo is a naïve music director of film and commercials, and works part-time at a music institute run by his friend. Until one day, his friend flees from his debts and workload, leaving Jung-woo to face the angry creditors, one of whom takes Jung-woo's precious guitar. While having a drink with director Kim, one of the creditors, Jung-woo meets Soo-kyung, whose sister is involved in the director's project. Soo-kyung is a promising creative director at an advertising agency, and Jung-woo's brief encounter with her leaves a good impression on him. When Jung-woo takes a job working on commercial music to buy back his guitar, the two run into each other. As they begin to spend time together at work and after-hours drinks, the more Jung-woo and Soo-kyung learn about each other. Aside from feeling attraction towards each other, they realize that they have several things in common, like coming from an atypical family and dreams of going on a winery tour. However, their relationship is put to the test when Jung-woo doesn't show up on the day of Soo-kyung's presentation because he was caught in heavy traffic. Soo-kyung misunderstands, calling him irresponsible, and the two break up. But not long after, they get a chance to work together on a project in Santa Barbara, California, which happens to be the location of their dream winery tour.

Cast

 Lee Sang-yoon as Jung-woo
 Yoon Jin-seo as Soo-kyung
 Esom as So-young
 Seo Beom-seok as Director Kim
 Shin Dong-mi as Ho-kyung
 Kim Jung-eun  as Director Son 
 Baek Won-gil as Team leader Kim 
 Kim Yong-jin as Director Jung
 Lee Kyu-hoi as Yong-rak 
 Baik Hyun-jhin as Director Baek 
 Cha Soo-min as Soo-jin 
 Darcy Paquet as United States agent
 Baek Jae-ho as Soo-kyung's male senior colleague
 Kim Sang-seok as Assistant director 
 Jang Seok-won as PD 
 Jeong Mi-ra as Mom's voice
 Choi Yoon-so as Actress filming
 Ubare as Lot cafe keyboardist
 Lee Ga-hyun as Girl at the lot cafe opening
 Kim Tae-woo as Representative Jo (cameo)
 Park Hae-il as Reporter's voice (cameo)
 Kim Hye-na as Actress at the premiere (cameo)

References

External links 
 
 
 

2014 films
2010s Korean-language films
South Korean romantic drama films
Films set in Santa Barbara, California
Sponge Entertainment films
2010s South Korean films